The Junglinster Longwave Transmitter is a longwave broadcasting facility used by RTL near Junglinster, Luxembourg, which went into service in 1932. Its aerial consists of three free-standing steel-framework towers, which are ground fed radiators. These towers formed a directional aerial for the frequency 234 kHz and until 1980 were 250 metres high. Since 1980 their height has been 215 metres.

Junglinster longwave transmitter was at time of inauguration one of the most powerful transmitters in the world. It was discovered that its signal can under some conditions show cross modulation with other radio stations by ionospheric reflection. This phenomenon was named "Luxembourg effect" after the circumstance that it was first detected at the signal of this transmitter in Luxembourg.

Since the inauguration of the Beidweiler longwave transmitter the Junglinster longwave transmitter has been only a spare.

Also at the site of Junglinster Longwave Transmitter are the shortwave transmitters of RTL, at the frequencies 6090 kHz and 15350 kHz were used. Transmitting on 6090 kHz, it is of special interest as it was (until the 80s) one of the best known radio stations in Germany and several radio sets had a special switch for its reception, the so-called "Luxembourg"-switch.
Today this transmitter works in DRM mode.

From 1951 on the site of Junglinster Longwave transmitter was also the mediumwave transmitter. It moved to Marnach in 1955.

Brief history

See also
 Lattice tower
 List of famous transmission sites

References

External links

 
 http://www.skyscraperpage.com/diagrams/?b45485
 http://www.skyscraperpage.com/diagrams/?b45487
 http://www.skyscraperpage.com/diagrams/?b45488
 http://perso.wanadoo.fr/tvignaud/galerie/etranger/l-junglinster.htm
 https://theantennasite.com/countries/luxembourg/junglinster-stationradio.html

Lattice towers
Towers in Luxembourg
Radio masts and towers in Europe
Longwave Transmitter
Transmitter sites in Luxembourg